The Stuttgart Database of Scientific Illustrators 1450–1950 (abbreviated DSI) is an online repository of bibliographic data about people who illustrated published scientific works from the time of the invention of the printing press, around 1450, until 1950; the latter cut-off chosen with the intention of excluding currently-active illustrators. The database includes those who worked in a variety of fields, including astronomical, botanical, zoological and medical illustration.

The database is hosted by the University of Stuttgart. Content is displayed in English, and is free to access. As of January 2020, the site's homepage states that the database includes over 12,500 illustrators. The site is searchable by 20 fields.

Suggestions for additional entries, or amendments, may be submitted by members of the public, but are subject to editorial review before inclusion.


References

Further reading

External links 

 

Bibliographic databases and indexes
Online databases
German websites
English-language websites
University of Stuttgart
2011 establishments in Germany